Blippy was a social media sharing site operated from Palo Alto, California by a company of the same name, for users to post and follow each other's updates about their purchases of goods and services. It was described as the "Twitter of personal finance", and was often compared with Twitter because it was based on that company's open sharing model. One purpose of the site was to facilitate discussion and comparison shopping among people who are connected with each other online. As of July, 2010, the company primarily focused on social sharing of product and service reviews. The Blippy service was shut down as of May 2011.

History
Blippy was founded by Ashvin Kumar, Chris Estreich, and Philip J. Kaplan. Blippy launched on $1.6 million of financing from a number of prominent venture capital firms, including Charles River Ventures and Sequoia Capital, and angel investors Evan Williams, Jason Calacanis and James Hong.

On April 23, 2010, social media guide Mashable revealed that Blippy had allowed Google to index detailed transaction information, thus resulting in four users' full credit card numbers being exposed to the public. A blog post from the official Blippy blog claimed the incident was "a lot less bad than it looks" and apologized for their mistake of putting credit card information in a hidden div tag during the beta test period of the website. This extended information was indexed by Google and was viewable in Google cache.

A May 2011 TechCrunch article discussed the decline of the service as it struggled to find relevance among consumers. According to then-CEO Ashvin Kumar, the service was unable to significantly increase user engagement, indicating that Blippy, at the time, had only 100,000 registered users and, of those, only 30% had shared a purchase. Kumar indicated that the Blippy staff was considering moving in a different direction in the social commerce category away from the current Blippy product.  The service was shut down shortly thereafter.

References

Companies based in San Francisco
Defunct social networking services
Internet properties established in 2009